The abnāʾ al-dawla (meaning "sons of the regime/dynasty"), often simply " the Abnāʾ", is a term for the Khorasani Arabs who had participated in the Abbasid Revolution of 749–750 and their descendants, who settled in Baghdad and Iraq. They became the ruling elite of the Abbasid Caliphate and formed the mainstay of the caliphal army. However, the term appears rarely in the sources until the time of the Fourth Fitna civil war in the 810s, when it is applied to the Khurasanis of Baghdad, who overwhelmingly supported Caliph al-Amin against his brother al-Ma'mun. The terms ahl Khurāsān ("people of Khurasan") and abnāʾ ahl Khurāsān ("sons of the people of Khurasan") are more frequently used for the Khurasanis who formed the mainstay of the Abbasid regime in general. Following al-Ma'mun's victory in the civil war, the abnāʾ al-dawla were largely replaced by the latter's Persian followers, and under his successor al-Mu'tasim, the rise of the Turkish slave-soldiers to power began.

Sources
 
 
 

Government of the Abbasid Caliphate
Military units and formations of the Abbasid Caliphate
Military personnel of the Abbasid Caliphate